Millendon is a suburb of Perth, Western Australia in the City of Swan local government area. The area has several wineries that make the Swan Valley popular for its wine production.

Wineries 
  Lamont's
 Neilson's Estate

References

Suburbs of Perth, Western Australia
Suburbs and localities in the City of Swan